The Boktykaryn is a river in Sozak District, Turkistan Region, Kazakhstan.

The river basin is used for watering livestock grazing in the surrounding area.

Course 
The Boktykaryn has its sources in an artesian aquifer area of the western sector of the Betpak Dala. The Boktykaryn runs parallel to the Sarysu channel for most of its course until in its last stretch it bends southwestwards, and then again southwards shortly before its mouth. Finally, it reaches intermittent lake Ashchykol of the Ashchykol Depression and enters it from the northern end. 

The river is fed by snow and dries up in the summer months.

See also
List of rivers of Kazakhstan

References

External links
Artezianskiy Kolodets Boktykaryn

Rivers of Kazakhstan
Turkistan Region
Endorheic basins of Asia